Hita is a municipality in the comarca of La Alcarria, in the province of Guadalajara (province), Spain.  

Hita is known for the title "Archpriest of Hita" (Arcipreste de Hita) attributed to the author Juan Ruiz of the medieval Spanish poem The Book of Good Love (El libro de buen amor).

See also
Monastery of Sopetrán

References

External links
 Guía de Hita
 Sopetrán

Municipalities in the Province of Guadalajara